The 2012 Harvard Crimson football team represented Harvard University in the 2012 NCAA Division I FCS football season. They were led by 19th-year head coach Tim Murphy and played their home games at Harvard Stadium. They were a member of the Ivy League. They finished the season 8–2 overall 5–2 in Ivy League play to place second. Harvard averaged 11,519 fans per game.

Schedule

Ranking movements

References

Harvard
Harvard Crimson football seasons
Harvard Crimson football
Harvard Crimson football